Jaywant Y. Lele (13 September 1938 – 19 September 2013, in Baroda) was an Indian cricket administrator, best remembered for serving as the secretary of the Board of Control for Cricket in India (BCCI) from 1996 to 2001, being preceded in the post by Jagmohan Dalmiya and succeeded by Niranjan Shah. He also authored a memoir titled I Was There: Memoirs of a Cricket Administrator (2011).

References 

1938 births
2013 deaths
Indian cricket administrators
Indian writers